Lesbian, gay, bisexual and transgender (LGBT) people in Tuvalu face challenges not faced by non-LGBT people. Sections 153, 154 and 155 of the Penal Code outlaw male homosexual intercourse with a penalty of up to 14 years in prison, but the law is not enforced. Employment discrimination on the basis of sexual orientation has been banned since 2017.

In 2011, Tuvalu signed the "joint statement on ending acts of violence and related human rights violations based on sexual orientation and gender identity" at the United Nations, condemning violence and discrimination against LGBT people.

History
Tuvalu, much like the rest of Polynesia, used to be tolerant of same-sex relationships and transgender people before the arrival of the Europeans and Christianity.  Bisexual relations were also quite commonplace among the islands, as many island kings kept both male and female partners in their royal huts for intimate relations.

People who are assigned male at birth but live and behave as women are called , or pina, in Tuvalu, and historically had certain societal roles, such as basket weaving. They were also known for their talent to elaborate dance ceremonies. The Tuvalu Pina Association was established in 2015. The role of the organisation is to advocate for the rights of pina. The association has 15 members, who are members of two informal pina groups.

Legality of same-sex sexual activity
The Penal Code prohibits male homosexual and heterosexual anal intercourse. According to the United States Department of State, there were no reports of prosecution of consenting adults under these provisions. The age of consent for heterosexual vaginal sex and lesbian sex is 15.

Penal Code
Section 153: Unnatural offences
Any person who —
(a) commits buggery with another person or with an animal; or
(b) permits a male person to commit buggery with him or her,
shall be guilty of a felony, and shall be liable to imprisonment for 14 years.

Section 154: Attempts to commit unnatural offences and indecent assault
Any person who attempts to commit any of the offences specified in the last preceding section, or who is guilty of any assault with intent to commit the same,
or any indecent assault upon any male person shall be guilty of a felony, and shall be liable to imprisonment for 7 years.

Section 155: Indecent practices between males
Any male person who, whether in public or private, commits any act of gross indecency with another male person, or procures another male person to commit any
act of gross indecency with him, or attempts to procure the commission of any such
act by any male person with himself or with another male person, whether in public
or private, shall be guilty of a felony, and shall be liable to imprisonment for 5 years.

Recognition of same-sex relationships
Tuvalu does not recognize same-sex marriage or civil unions. The Marriage Act (Cap 29) does not expressly prohibit the recognition of same-sex unions, but generally assumes the parties to be male and female. Same-sex marriages do not appear in the Act's "restrictions on marriage" section.

Discrimination protections
The Labour and Employment Relations Act 2017 bans discrimination based on sexual orientation. Workplace discrimination on the basis of "ethnic origin, race, colour, national extraction, social origin, social class or economic status; or gender, sex, pregnancy, marital status, sexual orientation or family responsibilities; or age, state of health, HIV/AIDS status, or disability; or religion or political opinion; or trade union membership or activity; or involvement in any dispute, an investigation or legal proceedings" is prohibited.

Statistics
According to a 2005 study, about 14% of young Tuvaluan men between the age of 15 and 24 had had sex with a male partner sometime in their lives.

According to 2017 estimates from UNAIDS, there were about 300 men who have sex with men (MSM) in the country, and about 40  (transgender people).

See also 
 Human rights in Tuvalu
 LGBT rights in Oceania
LGBT rights in the Commonwealth of Nations

References

LGBT in Tuvalu
Tuvalu
Politics of Tuvalu
Law of Tuvalu